Oost is a resort in Suriname, located in the Para District.  Its population at the 2012 census was 8,016. The main town in the resort is Paranam. Oost is also home to the former leper colony Bethesda. The Paranam alumina refinery is located near the town of Paranam. The Accaribo area is becoming tourist spot with the main attractions White Beach and Caribo Beach Resort.

The former capital of Suriname, Torarica is located in the Oost Resort. It was settled by Portuguese Jews in 1629. One origin offered for its name is as a Portuguese coinage meaning "Opulent Torah". By 1665, the village of Paramaribo was expanded and quickly outranked Torarica.

The Lokono village of Powakka is located in the resort.

References

Resorts of Suriname
Populated places in Para District